Boana latistriata is a species of frog in the family Hylidae. It is endemic to Brazil and only known from its type locality, Itatiaia National Park, and from Marmelópolis, both in the state of Minas Gerais. The specific name latistriata refers to the wide stripes on the back of this frog.

Description
Adult males measure  and adult females  in snout–vent length. The tympanum is distinct. Finger and toe tips bear adhesive discs; fingers have traces of webbing while the toes are moderately webbed. The dorsum has a characteristic pattern consisting of four wide, light brown longitudinal stripes interspersed by three narrow brown stripes. The flanks have a dark brown lateral stripe delimited by a white line above and by a narrow white stripe below. Males have a subgular vocal sac.

The tail fin is higher than the body.

Reproduction
Males call from dusk to late at night (at least to 2 am), perched on shrubs and grass, near or above the water. They have two types of advertisement calls: a short, single-note call with a lower pulse period, and a long call with higher pulse period. Calling males may engage in fights.

Habitat and conservation
The tadpoles develop in rivulets and are benthic, probably feeding on organic matter.

This species is threatened by deforestation and fragmentation of the Atlantic forest habitat. It is present in the Itatiaia National Park.

References

Boana
Amphibians of Brazil
Endemic fauna of Brazil
Amphibians described in 2004
Taxa named by Ulisses Caramaschi
Taxonomy articles created by Polbot